An Avarohana, Avarohanam or Avaroha, in the context of Indian classical music, is the descending scale of any raga. The notes descend in pitch from the upper tonic (taar shadja or Sa) down to the lower tonic, possibly in a crooked (vakra) manner.

Examples
In raga Darbari, an Asavari-thaat raga with vadi-samvadi R-P, the avroha is R' n S' d~ n P, m P g~ m R S, with andolan on the dhaivat and gandhar.

In Malahari, which is janya raga of 15th melakarta Mayamalavagowla, the avarohana is S D1 P M1 G2 R1 S. See swaras in Carnatic music for description of this notation.

In Sahana, a janya raga of 28th melakarta Harikambhoji, the Avarohana is S N2 D2 P M1 G3 M1 R2 G3 R2 S. This raga in its avarohana has the notes jumping from one to another (a bit like Dattu). This changes the whole feel of the raga, making Sahana a beautiful raga to listen to.

References

Carnatic music terminology
Hindustani music terminology
Ragas